Asaro'o, or Morafa, is one of the Finisterre languages of Papua New Guinea. Molet may be a dialect or a closely related language.

References

Finisterre languages
Languages of Madang Province